Bardehsur (also Romanized as Bardehsūr) is a village in Melkari Rural District, Vazineh District, Sardasht County, West Azerbaijan Province, Iran. At the 2006 census, its population was 137, in 22 families.

References 

Populated places in Sardasht County